Psycho Beach Party is a 2000 comedy horror film based on the off-Broadway play of the same name, directed by Robert Lee King. Charles Busch wrote both the original play and the screenplay. As the title suggests, Psycho Beach Party, set in 1962 Malibu Beach, is a parody of 1950s’ psychodramas, 1960s’ beach movies, and 1980s’ slasher films.

Plot
Florence Forrest (Lauren Ambrose) is a Gidget-like character determined to learn to surf, and earns the nickname "Chicklet" from the surfer guys.  Chicklet, though, begins displaying multiple personalities, experiences inexplicable blackouts, and fears that she might be the one responsible for a series of mysterious murders in her beachside town. The deaths are investigated by Captain Monica Stark (Charles Busch), who also suspects Chicklet's mother (Beth Broderick), Chicklet's best friend Berdine (Danni Wheeler), surfing guru the Great Kanaka (Thomas Gibson), and B-movie actress Bettina Barnes (Kimberley Davies).

Other characters include university dropout (and Chicklet's love interest) Starcat (Nicholas Brendon), Swedish exchange student Lars (Matt Keeslar), surfers Yo-Yo (Nick Cornish) and Provoloney (Andrew Levitas), Starcat's girlfriend Marvel Ann (Amy Adams), and the class "queen bee" Rhonda (Kathleen Robertson).

Cast
 Lauren Ambrose as Florence "Chicklet" Forrest
 Thomas Gibson as Kanaka
 Nicholas Brendon as Starcat
 Kimberley Davies as Bettina Barnes
 Matt Keeslar as Lars
 Charles Busch as Captain Monica Stark
 Beth Broderick as Ruth Forrest
 Amy Adams as Marvel Ann
 Kathleen Robertson as Rhonda
 Nick Cornish as Yo-Yo
 Andrew Levitas as Provoloney
 Channon Roe as Wedge Riley
 Jenica Bergere as Cookie
 Danni Wheeler as Berdine
 Nathan Bexton as T.J.
 Buddy Quaid as Junior
 Nicholas D'Agosto as The Counterman

Play and productions
The play was originally entitled Gidget Goes Psychotic, but the title was changed due to concerns about copyright. In the original 1987 production, Charles Busch played the role of Chicklet. Deciding that he might not be believable in the role of a 16-year-old girl ("while I can still manage, with the aid of a sympathetic cameraman, to play a sophisticated 25, 16 would be a stretch"), he added the character of Monica Stark to the movie.

After over 20 years, the play had its premiere UK production by Vertigo Theatre Productions in Manchester in March 2011. The production returned in August 2012 at Sacha's Hotel Ballroom. A production was held in Australia at the Bondi Pavilion Theatre from November to December 2012; productions also ran in Melbourne (notably at the Midsumma Festival) in early 2013, receiving generally positive reviews.

Melbourne, Australia, was to also hold another production of Psycho Beach Party opening in March 2021 by Essendon Theatre Company.

Reception
, the film holds a 55% approval rating on Rotten Tomatoes, based on 33 reviews with an average rating of 5.55/10.

In a positive review, Stephen Holden of The New York Times states that the film "accomplishes what no stage production could. By assiduously copying the look and sound of those '60s movies -- the wriggling title sequences, the twangy surf music, and the gawky gee-whiz screen acting style -- it definitively skewers the false innocence of American pop culture on the eve of the countercultural deluge. Most of the play's subversive humor has arrived on the screen intact." Los Angeles Times critic Kevin Thomas compared the film unfavorably to its source material, opining that it "has to be twice as funny a play as it is as a movie"; he further explains that "deliberate camp like this film presents a special challenge: It must generate and sustain a high level of energy or it will swiftly fall flat. The latter is too often the case here."

Praising the "strong women" of the film, Bob Graham of the San Francisco Chronicle also wrote that Busch (as Monica Stark) "captures the woman-alone-in-the-world toughness of the roles played by the stars he loves. It goes beyond camp. He is sincere." However, Graham reasoned that the film has "rough edges", despite conceding that "they probably work to this larky, cheeky picture's advantage". He subsequently notes, "In some instances, it's hard to tell the really bad acting from the intentionally bad acting." Dennis Lim of The Village Voice was negative, concluding that the film is an "awkward combination of garish set decoration and muffled humor" and that "the viewer is left to ponder the number of levels on which this counts as a pointless exercise—a parody of parodic movies, a deconstruction of transparent genres, [and] a self-negatingly knowing example of camp".

Soundtrack 
The original motion-picture soundtrack for Psycho Beach Party was released by Nettwerk Records under the Unforscene Music imprint on September 12, 2000.

 Ben Vaughn – Main Title
Los Straightjackets – Tailspin
Ben Vaughn – Marvel Ann On The Prowl
Ben Vaughn – Wrestle
The Halibuts – Night Crawler
Ben Vaughn – Chicklet Meets Surfers
Ben Vaughn – Neenie's Famous Weenies
Hillbilly Soul Surfers – Cha-Wow-Wow
Ben Vaughn – Chicklet Learns To Surf
Four Piece Suit – Bombasteroid
Ben Vaughn – Chicklet Wipes Out
Ben Vaughn – Mournful Surfers
Ben Vaughn – Romantic Beach Scene
Ben Vaughn – Kanaka's Shack
The Fathoms – Overboard
Los Straightjackets – Tempest
Man Or Astro-Man? – Mermaid Love
Ben Vaughn – P-S-Y-C-H-O (Psycho) End Title

Home media
The film was released unrated on Region 1 DVD on November 8, 2005, by Strand Releasing. The disc contains an audio commentary with director Robert Lee King and screenwriter Charles Busch, the theatrical trailer, and the music video of "Tempest" by the band Los Straitjackets.

A Blu-ray was released on August 18, 2015.

Censorship
The film runs for 95 minutes NTSC on its American DVD release, but the version that was submitted to the British Board of Film Classification (BBFC) runs 85 minutes.  It was passed uncut with a 15 rating. suggesting that it may have been pre-cut by TLA Releasing before submission.  Similarly, the version submitted by Magna Pacific to the Office of Film and Literature Classification in Australia in 2001 ran for 84 minutes. The film was rated M in Australia, indicating that the film may not have been cut due to concerns over material.

References

External links
 Charles Busch's website
 
 

2000 films
2000 comedy horror films
American films based on plays
American horror films
Films set in the 1960s
Plays by Charles Busch
Beach party films
Australian comedy horror films
2000 comedy films
LGBT-related black comedy films
2000s English-language films
2000s American films
LGBT-related comedy horror films